Kaarlo Castrén's cabinet was the fourth Government of the Republic of Finland. The cabinet's period was from April 17, 1919 to August 15, 1919. It was a minority government.

Assembly

References 

Castren
1919 establishments in Finland
1919 disestablishments in Finland
Cabinets established in 1919
Cabinets disestablished in 1919